Deris Benavides (born May 1, 1976) is a Belizean professional midfielder currently playing for San Felipe Barcelona.

External links
 

1976 births
Living people
Belizean footballers
Belize international footballers
2007 UNCAF Nations Cup players
2011 Copa Centroamericana players
Association football midfielders
Belmopan Bandits players
Verdes FC players
San Pedro Seadogs FC players